Mutation is a book written by Robin Cook about the ethics of genetic engineering. It brings up the benefits, risks, and consequences.

Plot summary
Victor Frank, and his wife Marsha, are unable to have a second child due to Marsha's infertility. They turn to surrogacy as an alternate method of conception. Victor, an obstetrician-gynaecologist and owner of the biochemical company Chimera Inc., injects the egg implanted in his wife with an agent called Nerve Growth Factor (NGF) into chromosome six, which causes the baby to grow more neurons than usual, as a result making them super intelligent. Their son, VJ (Victor Junior), is born a genius. He is able to talk in six months and read in thirteen. Victor wonders if his experiment was a mistake.

Several years later, VJ's brother, David, and nanny, Janice, both die of an unexplainable rare form of liver cancer. At about three, VJ experiences a drop in intelligence, leading Victor to think his experiment is a failure. VJ is not a genius anymore. VJ lives a secluded life from that point, leading his psychiatrist mother to worry, to the annoyance of Victor who believes VJ is fine. When VJ turns eleven, a disastrous chain of events begins. Victor had injected two other eggs with NGF, which were given to two families who work at Chimera through the fertility clinic there. They both inexplicably die at age three because of brain edema. Victor later finds out they had been given the antibiotic Cephaloclor, which causes the nerve cell growth process to begin again. This causes their brains to grow too large for their skulls, killing them. Their parents, however, were told their children had deadly allergies to this antibiotic.

Victor launches an investigation into the children's deaths, and finds no explanation for how they got the antibiotic. He also insists on VJ getting a full neurological work-up, making Marsha suspicious. Victor eventually reveals his experiment to Marsha, horrifying her. She then gives VJ a full psychological work-up as well. Nothing seems out of the ordinary in the results, but Marsha realizes the results don't seem to reflect VJ's real personality. This leads her to believe that he analyzed the tests and beat them. Victor, meanwhile, is having the DNA of the tumors that killed his older son and nanny analyzed. When the DNA in the tumors is sequenced, there is an identical strand of alien DNA in both of them.

Victor then goes looking for VJ, who spends a lot of time at the lab, and sees him head under an old clock tower on the Chimera campus. Victor follows him, and is knocked out by a guard. When he wakes up he is in a laboratory built by VJ, where he has solved many of the biochemical problems Victor had been trying to solve. Victor is amazed by his son's genius, and rushes to show Marsha. Marsha reacts differently and is worried about VJ, especially about the part of the lab he didn't show them. Victor and Marsha come back the next day and insist on VJ showing them the rest of the lab. In one room, VJ is growing fetuses, the five eggs from Marsha that had not been implanted, in artificial wombs. VJ tells them that there is no fifth fetus because of a failed implantation attempt in the artificial womb, and also reveals that he has altered the babies to make them mentally retarded, so they won't be more intelligent than him. After this, he reveals that he killed the other two children who had been injected with NGF for the same reason, so he would be the only super genius. Not only did he kill the two children, he also used a method he had created for injecting cancer into someone to kill David, Janice, and a teacher who was prying into his life.

VJ then leads his horrified parents into another room, where he has tanks full of E. coli genetically altered to produce cocaine, which he sold to Colombian drug dealers to finance his lab. VJ then insists that his parents announce their intent to him. Marsha convinces VJ to leave her and Victor to talk alone, and they decide that they must kill their son. NGF may have made VJ a genius, but at the cost of his conscience. Victor lies to VJ, and VJ agrees to release him on two conditions. One, that Marsha stay in the lab as a hostage, and two, that Victor must have a guard with him at all times. Victor takes the guard back to his house and drugs him. He then rushes to his lab, where he synthesizes nitroglycerin. He makes a bomb with the nitroglycerin, and plants it in a tunnel by VJ's lab. He convinces VJ to release Marsha so she can do her work, and stalls VJ until the bomb goes off, causing the gates redirecting a river under the clock tower to break.  VJ rushes for the exit, but Victor stops him discovering that, ironically, despite the fact VJ's mind is beyond his years, he still has the strength of a ten-year-old. Victor holds him down until the lab floods, killing them both.

One year later, a mother brings in her teenage daughter and her daughter's child to her office. Marsha surmises from the fact that the 18-month child is reading a medical journal, something VJ did, and his ice blue eyes, a trait VJ had, that this child is the "failed" zygote. She decides she will have to go through another VJ-like experience, "with Joe's help and end forever the nightmare her husband had begun".

1989 American novels
Novels by Robin Cook
Novels about genetic engineering